Cheung Chau (lit. It is nicknamed the 'dumbbell island (啞鈴島)' due to its shape. It has been inhabited for longer than most other places in Hong Kong, and had a population of 22,740 . Administratively, it is part of the Islands District.

Geography
Geographically the island is formed from two mostly granite masses joined by a tombolo. Thus, it is redundant to say "Cheung Chau Island". The island is dumbbell-shaped, with hills at the northern and southern ends and the settlements concentrated in between.

Economy
The central part of the island is well developed with shops and houses. The lane-ways are so narrow that normal motor traffic is impossible. Instead, there are small motorised trucks officially termed "village vehicles", which include specially designed mini-fire engines, ambulances and police cars. 

Residential areas also exist on the hills of the north and south.

Traditionally the island was a fishing village and there are still fishing fleets working from the harbour. However, in recent years the island has become a major tourist attraction, offering a mixture of sandy swimming beaches, seafood cafés, and traditional Chinese culture.

History
Under the terms of the 1898 Second Convention of Peking, the New Territories and 200 smaller islands including Cheung Chau Island were leased to the United Kingdom for 99 years. At that time, Cheung Chau was mainly a fishing village; it had more residents living on junks than on land. Cheung Chau had already been settled by people from other places in Southern China; for example, Hoklo, they are mainly fishing people; Hakka people; Chiu Chau; and Yue Ca. The island slowly evolved into a commercial hub with merchants selling supplies to the local fishing people, boat repair and fishing gear as well as the place to do business for fishing people and small farmers of other nearby islands like Lantau Island.

At the time of the 1911 census, the population of Cheung Chau, both land and boat based, was 7,686. The number of males was 4,519.

From 2000, a spate of suicide cases (most of them by "burning charcoal") took place inside rental holiday homes on the island. Hong Kong Chinese-language newspapers soon dubbed the island "Death Island" and stories concerning apparitions appeared in the wake of news about the succeeding suicides. In 2005 a local councillor Lam Kit-sing proposed a "suicide theme-park" to be built to capitalise on the island's now macabre reputation. Those plans were quickly ridiculed and subsequently rejected. Soon after, the choice of Cheung Chau for would-be suicides tailed off.

Sights

Temples
Temples on Cheung Chau include:
Pak Tai Temple – one of the oldest temples in Hong Kong. The temple was built in 1783. It was demolished and completely rebuilt in 1989. In front of the temple, there are 4 pairs of guarding lions. Before the altar are statues of two generals, "Thousand Miles Eye" and "Favourable Wind Ear", who together are traditionally said to be able to hear and see everything
Four temples dedicated to Tin Hau
Hung Shing Temple. Built in 1993, it is managed by the Chinese Temples Committee.
Kwan Kung Chung Yi Ting, a traditional temple built in 1973, dedicated to the god of justice Kwan Tai
 Kwun Yam Temple aka. Shui Yuet Temple aka. Chi Kung, near Kwun Yam Wan beach. Built before 1840, and dedicated to Guanyin (Kwun Yam), it gave its name to the nearby bay Kwun Yam Wan.

Others
Tung Wan and Kwun Yam Wan beaches
Rock carvings located near Tung Wan Beach were reported by geologists in 1970, and are declared monuments of Hong Kong. This 3000-year-old rock carving is located on the east of the island, immediately below the Warwick Hotel. It consists of two groups of similar carved lines surrounding small depressions.
Cheung Po Tsai Cave, alleged to be the hiding place of Cheung Po Tsai, a 19th-century pirate
Cheung Chau Mini Great Wall, a hiking trail

Hospitals

There is one local hospital providing basic care and one former hospital on the island.

St. John Hospital 

St. John Hospital, also known as Haw Par Hospital, was founded in 1934 by Hong Kong St. John Ambulance and has been the island's main hospital since 1988.

Cheung Chau Fong Bin Hospital (Closed) 

Fong Bin Hospital was founded in 1872 to provide shelter for homeless, medical care and mortuary for those whom perish during typhoons.

The hospital was formed by locals on the island, but was eclipsed by the Haw Par Hospital and closed in 1988.

Culture

Festivals

Bun Festival

The annual Cheung Chau Bun Festival is a festival which includes a parade of floats, most famously including young children dressed as famous characters doing impossible balancing acts. It lasts three to four days and attracts tens of thousands of visitors to the island.

Education

Formerly there were 7 primary schools including the Fisheries Joint Association Public School, Shun Dal Primary School and The Cheung Chau Government Primary School and three secondary schools including the now closed Caritas Saint Paul's Secondary School. Although there are more people living on Cheung Chau now than ever, the fertility rate throughout Hong Kong has dropped significantly leading to many school closings throughout the city.

Cheung Chau in Primary One Admission (POA) School Net 97. Within the school net are the three aided schools (operated independently but funded with government money) on Cheung Chau; no government schools are in this net.

Notable people
Lee Lai Shan, a windsurfer, won Hong Kong's first Olympic gold medal in 1996. That Olympic gold was also Hong Kong's last Olympic medal, as in 1997 Hong Kong became a Special Administrative Region of the People's Republic of China and now competes in the Olympics as Hong Kong, China.
Vincent Lee Kwun Leung, a visual artist
Kong-Kwan Cheung, First Principal of Cheung Chau Fisheries Joint Association Public School

Climate

Transportation

Sun Ferry operates ferries between Central pier number 5 and Cheung Chau. The ferries run approximately every 30 minutes depending upon time of day. Schedules on Sundays and public holidays differ from weekdays. The trip of about  takes 55 minutes for ordinary ferries or 35 minutes for high speed ferries. Cheung Chau also has a ferry service to other outlying islands and regions such as Mui Wo and Chi Ma Wan.

Due to inaccessibility to cars and other vehicles, most residents use bicycles for personal transportation. A number of bicycle rental shops near the ferry pier rent bicycles to tourists. The only motor vehicles on the island are those used by the emergency services, as well as village vehicles used to transport goods.

In popular culture
The 2001 Hong Kong animated feature film My Life as McDull mentioned Lee Lai-shan and McDull trained Bun Scrambling in Cheung Chau.

The 2002 Hong Kong film Just One Look was set in Cheung Chau, starring Twins, Shawn Yue and Wong You Nam.

The 2010 Hong Kong film The Fantastic Water Babes was set in Cheung Chau, starring Gillian Chung, Alex Fong and Eva Huang.

See also

 Beaches of Hong Kong
 List of islands and peninsulas of Hong Kong
 List of places in Hong Kong

References

External links

 Cheung Chau Island – Cheung Chau page at Hong Kong Tourism Board
 Chinese Festivals -Hong Kong Tourism Board
 My Hometown – Cheung Chau – TV program by the Radio Television Hong Kong on Cheung Chau. (video archive)
 Hong Kong’s Other Peak – and the City’s Overlooked History of Segregation

 
Islands of Hong Kong
Populated places in Hong Kong